Eleonora Maria Teresa of Savoy (28 February 1728 – 14 August 1781) was a Savoyard princess, the eldest daughter of Charles Emmanuel III of Sardinia and his second wife Polyxena of Hesse-Rotenburg. She died unmarried.

Biography

Eleonora Maria Teresa di Savoia was the second child and eldest daughter of Charles Emmanuel III, King of Sardinia and his second wife, the German Polyxena of the Landgraviate of Hesse-Rotenburg. She was born at the Royal Palace of Turin, the city residence of the Savoyard royal family.

She received the forename of her maternal grandmother, Eleonore of Löwenstein-Wertheim-Rochefort.

Her maternal cousins included Victor Amadeus II, Prince of Carignano and his younger sister the future princesse de Lamballe, both of which were born at the court of Savoy. Her paternal cousins included Ferdinand VI of Spain, who was king of Spain at the time of her birth.

She was born to a relatively happy marriage between her parents. Her paternal grandmother Anne Marie d'Orléans died in August 1728 when Eleonora was six months old.

Her mother died in 1735 when Eleonora was six. Thus she was the highest ranking female at the Savoyard court until the marriage of her brother, the future Victor Amadeus III to the Spanish Infanta Maria Antonietta in 1750.

Eleonora, and her sister Maria Luisa, were proposed as brides for Louis, Dauphin of France, eldest son of Louis XV of France who was their first cousin. The marriage never materialised due to marriage negotiations with the Spanish which led to the dauphin marrying Maria Teresa, an older sister of Maria Antonietta in 1744.

Her two nieces, Princesses Maria Giuseppina and Maria Teresa would later marry two sons of Louis, Dauphin of France in 1771 and 1773 respectively.

The spinster princess died at the Castle of Moncalieri, Turin at the age of 53. She was buried in the Royal Basilica of Superga overlooking Turin. Her sister in law Maria Antonietta died at Moncalieri in 1785.

Ancestry

References and notes

1728 births
1781 deaths
Nobility from Turin
Princesses of Savoy
Burials at the Basilica of Superga
Daughters of kings